Isle of Doubt is a 1922 American silent drama film directed by Hamilton Smith and starring Wyndham Standing, Dorothy Mackaill and George Fawcett. The title is sometimes written as The Isle of Doubt.

Cast
 Wyndham Standing as Dean Deland
 Dorothy Mackaill as Eleanor Warburton
 George Fawcett as Burton J. Warburton
 Marie Burke as Mrs. Warburton
 Warner Richmond as Gerry Patten
 Arthur Dewey as Bill Hardy

References

Bibliography
 Munden, Kenneth White. The American Film Institute Catalog of Motion Pictures Produced in the United States, Part 1. University of California Press, 1997.

External links
 

1922 films
1922 drama films
1920s English-language films
American silent feature films
Silent American drama films
American black-and-white films
Films directed by Hamilton Smith
1920s American films